The Ciric is a left tributary of the river Bahlui in Romania. It discharges into the Bahlui in the city Iași. Lakes Dorobanț, Aroneanu, Ciric I, Ciric II, Ciric III are located on the river Ciric, in the northeastern part of Iași. Over time, along the lakes of the Ciric, several leisure centers have been built.

References

Rivers of Romania
Rivers of Iași County